Franklin & Vermont is Ernie Halter's full-length album, released on June 28, 2010. The album is named after the cross streets where Halter lives in Los Angeles.

Track listing
"Hard to Let a Good Love Go" – 3:43
"Angel" – 3:33
"Gone" – 2:46
"Almost You" – 3:48
"Meant to Be" – 4:37 (Melissa Polinar cover)
"Black Coffee In Bed" – 3:25 (Squeeze cover)
"Come Home to Me" – 2:31
"Yes I Am" – 3:13
"In My Place" – 2:46 (Coldplay cover)
"We Got Love" – 2:51
"This Beautiful Ache (featuring Amy Kuney)" – 3:55

References

External links 
 Franklin & Vermont on iTunes

2010 albums
Pop rock albums by American artists